Jamil Ahmed Khan  is a Pakistani politician who had been a member of National Assembly of Pakistan from August 2018 to October 2022.

Political career
He was elected to the National Assembly of Pakistan from Constituency NA-237 (Malir-II) as a candidate of Pakistan Tehreek-e-Insaf in 2018 Pakistani general election.

On 27 September 2018, Prime Minister Imran Khan appointed him as Federal Parliamentary Secretary for Maritime Affairs.

Resignation
On April 10, 2022, he resigned from the National Assembly on the orders of Imran Khan. The new government did not accept the resignations of many members for fear of deteriorating the number of members. However, accepting the resignations of eleven members on July 28, 2022, one of them was Jamil Ahmed Khan. Later, by-elections were held again on his seat, Imran Khan made a surprising move to stand on his own in all the by-seats.

External Link

More Reading
 List of members of the 15th National Assembly of Pakistan

References

Living people
Pakistani MNAs 2018–2023
Pakistan Tehreek-e-Insaf politicians
Year of birth missing (living people)